Nemapteryx macronotacantha is a species of catfish in the family Ariidae. It was described by Pieter Bleeker in 1846, originally under the genus Arius. It inhabits southern and southeastern Asian brackish waters, also occurring in marine and freshwaters.

References

Ariidae
Fish described in 1846